Mamiye Brothers is family owned and operated company founded in 1947 in New York, New York that is a manufacturer of branded children's and teen's apparel. Some of the clothing brands licensed or directly owned by Mamiye include: Flapdoodles, Little Me, Guess Kids, Wallflower and Kensie.  Mamiye Brother products are distributed to mass market retailers such as department stores and specialty stores throughout the United States.

History

Recent
Mamiye acquired Flapdoodles Apparel launching and juniors jeanswear in 2005 and the company bought the rights to produce Bongo's branded apparel in 2006.

In 2007 the company purchased the "Little Me" kids clothing brand from S. Schwab Company. The S. Schwab Company closed its "Little Me" operation after the sale, letting go of most "Little Me" employees. "Little Me"

References

External links
 Hoovers Factsheet: Mamiye Brothers
 Homepage

Clothing companies of the United States
Companies based in New York City